Henry and Elizabeth Bockrath House is a historic home located in Jefferson City, Cole County, Missouri. It was built about 1899, and is a two-story, Second Empire style red brick dwelling. It sits on a limestone foundation and has a slate-covered faux mansard roof.  It features a decorative wood bracketed cornice.

It was listed on the National Register of Historic Places in 2013.

References

Houses on the National Register of Historic Places in Missouri
Second Empire architecture in Missouri
Houses completed in 1899
Buildings and structures in Jefferson City, Missouri
National Register of Historic Places in Cole County, Missouri